The Jutulpløgsla Crevasses form a crevasse field halfway up Jutulstraumen Glacier, about  southeast of Nashornet Mountain, in Queen Maud Land, Antarctica. They were mapped by Norwegian cartographers from surveys and air photos by the Norwegian–British–Swedish Antarctic Expedition (1949–52) and from air photos by the Norwegian expedition (1958–59) and named Jutulpløgsla (the giant's plowed field).

References

Crevasse fields of Queen Maud Land
Princess Martha Coast